Aloysius J Hogan was a Jesuit priest and president of Fordham University from 1930 until 1936. He was 39 years old when inaugurated president of the university. Before being appointed to Fordham University, Hogan earned a Doctor of Philosophy degree from Cambridge University, taught at Boston College for several years, and was Dean of Studies at two former Jesuit seminaries, located in Hyde Park, NY and Wernersville, PA. Hogan oversaw the building of Keating Hall, an academic building featuring a clock tower that reaches ninety feat above the hall's parapet. He also had the university's old athletic field, which had since been replaced with a new facility, transformed into a grassy quadrangle called Edwards Parade, and commissioned a marble statue of Jesus Christ, called Christ the Teacher, to be placed in the Keating Hall rotunda. Hogan was born in Pennsylvania in 1891. He died in 1943, at the age of 52.

References

External links 

1891 births
1943 deaths
Alumni of the University of Cambridge
20th-century American Jesuits
Boston College faculty
Presidents of Fordham University
Deans of the Georgetown University Graduate School of Arts and Sciences
20th-century American academics